Frugality is a former town in Cambria County, in the U.S. state of Pennsylvania. The GNIS classifies it as a populated place.

History
A post office called Frugality was in operation from 1887 until 1935. The name was selected as a sign of frugality of the residents.

References

Unincorporated communities in Cambria County, Pennsylvania
Unincorporated communities in Pennsylvania